The Ministry of Higher Education and Scientific Research (MOHESR) is a ministry of the government in the United Arab Emirates (UAE). Established in 1976, the Ministry has a number of departments, including the Commission for Academic Accreditation (CAA), which provides institutional licensure and degree accreditationCAA for private universities and their academic programmes in the UAE. It houses NAPO (the National Admissions and Placement Office) which provides admissions and placement services for the federal institutions of higher education, including United Arab Emirates University, Higher Colleges of Technology, and Zayed University, as well as the CEPA (Common Educational Proficiency Assessment) which assesses the English and Math skills of MOHESR applicants to higher education. The Ministry handles steps in the certificate attestation process, provides equivalency services for degrees and qualifications received outside of the UAE, and provides government scholarships for UAE nationals who wish to study overseas.

Sheikh Hamdan bin Mubarak Al Nahyan is the Minister of Higher Education and Scientific Research.

References

External links 
 Ministry of Higher Education and Scientific Research website 
 Ministry of Higher Education and Scientific Research website 
 Ministry of Higher Education and Scientific Research website 

1976 establishments in the United Arab Emirates
Ministries established in 1976
Organisations based in Abu Dhabi
Education in the United Arab Emirates
Ministry of Higher Education and Scientific Research
Government agencies of the United Arab Emirates
Science and technology in the United Arab Emirates
Scientific organisations based in the United Arab Emirates
United Arab Emirates